The Dancing Molly was a pirate sloop famous during the Oyster Wars for humiliating Virginia Governor William E. Cameron as he personally attempted its capture on 28 February 1883. Crewed solely by "plucky petticoated pirates" in the form of the captain's wife and two daughters, the single-masted sailboat outran the steamers Victoria J Peed and Pamlico while under fire.

Encounter with Governor Cameron
Having successfully captured seven oyster pirate boats in a raid the year before, Cameron set out to capture more in the steamers Victoria J Peed and Pamlico. To ensure media attention, the latter ship contained Cameron, his staff, and reporters from the New York Herald, Norfolk Evening Ledger, and Norfolk Virginian. Spotting the apparently abandoned Molly in an inlet (the other crew were gathering wood on shore), Cameron's ships headed to capture it, not knowing the wife and two daughters of Molly's captain were still aboard. A contemporary newspaper account describes:

The encounter led to a series of letters and editorials ridiculing Cameron, as the "laughing maidens of the 'Dancing Molly,' so completely outmaneuvered him" and jesting that Cameron's official report "on the oyster question" would be "replete with references to … the laughing lassies of the Dancing Molly." Combined with other difficulties in capturing oyster pirates, the embarrassed Cameron never sent an expedition against them again.

References

Sailing ships
Pirate ships
Chesapeake Bay
Maritime history of Virginia
Fishing conflicts
Oyster sloops